Dracula - The Undead is a video game released in 1991 for the Atari Lynx handheld system. The game is loosely based on Bram Stoker's novel Dracula and features Bram Stoker in the story as the narrator.

Gameplay 

The player takes on the role of Jonathan Harker as he tries to escape from Dracula's Castle. In the game you wake up with Dracula gone and you can explore the castle by moving from room to room. The game controls are a point and click, where you can interact with a certain number items in each room. You can also talk and interact with other NPC characters.

Plot

Development and release 

An updated port of Dracula the Undead for the Atari Jaguar CD was in development by Atari Corporation and was first announced in 1994, but it never released.

Reception 

Robert A. Jung reviewed the game which was later published to IGN. In his final verdict he wrote "Dracula the Undead offers traditional adventuring fare with an unusual premise, with enough challenge and appeal to satisfy most adventurers. The inability to save a game in progress hurts, but dedicated players who are willing to live with this flaw are encouraged to give the Count a visit." He then gave a score of 7 out of 10. Game Zero Magazine also reviewed the game giving a score of 70 out of 100.

References

External links 
 Dracula the Undead at AtariAge
 Dracula the Undead at GameFAQs
 Dracula the Undead at MobyGames

1991 video games
1990s horror video games
Atari games
Atari Lynx games
Atari Lynx-only games
Cancelled Atari Jaguar games
Hand Made Software games
Single-player video games
Video games based on Dracula
Video games developed in the United Kingdom
Video games set in castles